Denis Henriquez (Oranjestad, October 10, 1945) is an Aruban writer.

He studied physics in Delft and worked as a teacher  at the Erasmiaans Gymnasium from Rotterdam.

Works
1981 E soño di Alicia. Based on "Alice in Wonderland" by Lewis Carroll 
1988 Kas pabow (poems)
1992 Zuidstraat
1995 Delft blues
1999 De zomer van Alejandro Bulos

Prizes
Prijsvraag van het Antilliaans Verhaal, 1990

References and external links

DBNL Denis Henriquez

1945 births
Living people
Aruban writers